Ed Bussey is an internet entrepreneur who has been named in the 2015 and 2016 Sunday Times list of Debretts’ 500 most influential people in Britain. He is currently Founder of Quill and Chief Solutions Officer at Jellyfish.

Career

Military 
Bussey began his career in the Royal Navy, where he was awarded his officer commission. Following this, he held various security and counter-terrorism appointments around the world with the UK diplomatic service.

Ecommerce 
In 2000, Bussey was a founder and Global Marketing Director of figleaves.com, one of the early online fashion retailers. figleaves.com launched into the UK and US by 2005. with over a million customers in 66 countries. In 2004, figleaves.com was named “UK Internet Retailer of the Year”. In 2010 the company was bought by N Brown Plc. In 2018, Ed's latest venture, Quill Content, won Best Agency at the Ecommerce Awards.

Technology 
Following figleaves, Bussey become Chief Operating Officer at ZYB, with responsibilities for marketing, business development and operations. ZYB was a mobile social networking business with backing from Nordic Venture Partners. In 2007 Business Week called their service one of the ten most innovative mobile products of the year. It was later acquired by Vodafone Plc in May 2008.

In 2011, Bussey launched Quill, multi-language content production for ecommerce. Quill was ranked by Deloitte in the 2016 Fast 50 rankings for the UK's fastest growing tech businesses. and as part of its 2017 Technology Fast 500 EMEA rankings. In 2018, Quill was awarded Best Agency at the eCommerce Awards.

In May 2019, Quill Content was acquired by French media group, Webedia.

In 2021, Quill merged with digital transformation agency Jellyfish, to become its global Performance Content capability.

In September 2021 the capability was renamed Ecommerce Content.

Expeditions

At 21, Bussey was elected a Fellow of the Royal Geographical Society, for his mountaineering expeditions and extreme endurance event participation. He has taken part in expeditions or events in places like Bhutan, the Indian Himalayas, Alaska, Costa Rica, and southern Africa. In 2010 he completed an unsupported trek to the North Pole to raise money for the Global Angels charity

Honours & Awards

Bussey earned a degree in Natural Science (Psychology) from Cambridge University where he was President of the Young Entrepreneurs Society, and regional winner of the UK Young Entrepreneur of the Year competition He started his first business in university, which he sold even before he graduated.

In 2015, Bussey was named ‘Entrepreneur of the Year’ at the annual Great British Entrepreneur Awards He was included in the 2015 and 2016 Sunday Times list of Debretts’ 500 most influential people in Britain. In 2018  Bussey was named Disruptor of the Year at the UK Tech Founder Awards and runner-up in the Scale-up category at the Great British Entrepreneur Awards. Bussey is part of the London Stock Exchange ELITE programme and an active participant in the Tech London Advocates community.

Bussey was awarded with 'Entrepreneurial Success of the Year’ at the Heropreneurs Awards in 2019, recognising his achievements since leaving the military in 2000.

In 2021 Quill (now Jellyfish) was awarded Fashion Content Campaign of the Year at the UK Content Awards.

References 

Year of birth missing (living people)
Living people